Santosh Thakur (1922–2000) was a Bengali singer from Kolkata, India. He is primarily known as a Rabindrasangeet artist. He was the son of Sanskrit scholar Amareswar Thakur.

Career 
Santosh Thakur made an entry into the world of Rabindrasangeet in the early 1950s. He started taking regular Rabindrasangeet lessons under the tutelage of Sri. Subinoy Roy, Sri. Anadi Dastidar and others.
Was a regular Artist of All India Radio, he started performing as a Rabindrasangeet singer at Akashvani, Kolkata. He recorded two Tagore’s songs, "Tomari Jhornatolar Nirjone" and "Amar Nishito Ratero" (1966) with Hindustan Records under the training of his Guru Sri Subinoy Roy.

He founded a musical institution in Kolkata named 'Gandharvi'   in the year 1963, where students learned Rabindrasangeet under his training also under the tutelage of  Sri. Subinoy Roy, Smt. Sumitra Sen Smt. Bani Thakur Smt. Swapna Ghoshal . 'Gandharvi' was a popular institution and was also known for its regular performance of various concerts and Dance Dramas of Tagore. In the year 1971 'Gandharvi' was invited by The Bengalee Association of Hyderabad to perform 3 dance dramas of Tagore namely 'Tasher Desh', 'Shapmochan' and 'Mayar Khyala'.

References

External links 

 www.sensonmedia.net/information/re_name_road_kolkata.html 
 www.nitaisundar.com/Main.html?pagename=HaribolKutir.html
 https://books.google.com/books?id=3MIsAAAAIAAJ 
 calcutta1940s.org/407streetatlast.html
 Women in the Hindu Tradition - Book

1922 births
2000 deaths
Rabindra Sangeet exponents
Rabindranath Tagore
Bengali singers
20th-century Indian singers
Singers from West Bengal